The 2016–17 season was Oxford United's first season back in League One after gaining promotion the previous season, and their 123rd year in existence. As well as competing in League One, the club also participated in the FA Cup, League Cup and League Trophy.

Oxford lost three key players in the close season, Kemar Roofe departing for Leeds for a club record of £3m, Callum O'Dowda (less expectedly) to Bristol City for around £1m, and striker Danny Hylton who declined a contract renewal offer and joined Luton Town in League Two. United narrowly failed to sign Matty Taylor to replace the goal-scoring potential of these three players, but Chris Maguire, after protracted negotiations, signed a one-year contract extension and strikers Wes Thomas and Kane Hemmings were brought in to boost the forward line, the latter for a £250,000 fee. Manager Michael Appleton's first summer signing was goalkeeper Simon Eastwood. Eastwood had previously been on Oxford's books as cover for Ryan Clarke in 2010–11 but had failed to make an appearance. Another returning player was Rob Hall, a former loanee signed from Bolton Wanderers despite carrying a long-term injury. United spent what was believed to be a club record fee to secure the services of winger Marvin Johnson from Motherwell, and the defence was bolstered by the arrival of Christian Ribeiro, Aaron Martin and Curtis Nelson. Young midfielder John Lundstram was appointed captain to replace defender Jake Wright (who joined former Oxford manager Chris Wilder at eventual champions Sheffield United) and his deputy Johnny Mullins (who was not offered a new contract and joined teammate Hylton at Luton Town). Notable loanees from Premier League sides included Dan Crowley from Arsenal, Toni Martínez from West Ham and Conor McAleny from Everton.

After a shaky start which saw them in the relegation places after three games, League One newcomers United recovered strongly to finish 8th in the table, four points off the last playoff position, the highest of the promoted teams and in their highest placing at any point of the season. They again completed the double over local rivals Swindon Town, who were relegated to League Two. Eastwood, in stark contrast to his previous stint at the club, played every minute of United's 62 games in all competitions (the most competitive games played by any league team for the second season in succession) and was voted the club's Player of the Season by both fans and teammates at the end of the season. Maguire was the team's highest scorer with 17 goals in all competitions, with Hemmings chipping in with 15 and loanee McAleny scoring 10 in 18 League appearances in the second half of the season, including two hat-tricks. In total, Oxford scored 100 goals in all competitions.

For the second year running, Oxford reached the final of the League Trophy at Wembley Stadium but finished runners-up in the competition, this time beaten 2–1 by Coventry City. This was the club's fourth visit to the national stadium. They reached the fifth round of the FA Cup, beating Rotherham United and Newcastle United of the Championship before being eliminated by Middlesbrough of the Premier League. In the first round of the League Cup they also defeated Championship opposition in the shape of Birmingham City, but were knocked out in the second round by Brighton & Hove Albion.

The season covers the period from 1 July 2016 to 30 June 2017.

Transfers

Transfers in

Transfers out

Loans in

Loans out

Competitions

Pre-season friendlies

League One

League table

Results summary

Results by round

Matches

FA Cup

EFL Cup

EFL Trophy

Oxfordshire Senior Cup

Squad statistics

Appearances and goals

Top scorers

Disciplinary record

References

Oxford United
Oxford United F.C. seasons